Hazing (American English), initiation, beasting (British English), bastardisation (Australian English), ragging (South Asian English) or deposition refers to any activity expected of someone in joining or participating in a group that humiliates, degrades, abuses, or endangers them regardless of a person's willingness to participate.

Hazing is seen in many different types of social groups, including gangs, sports teams, schools, cliques, universities, military units, prisons, fraternities and sororities, and even workplaces in some cases. The initiation rites can range from relatively benign pranks to protracted patterns of behavior that rise to the level of abuse or criminal misconduct. Hazing is often prohibited by law or institutions such as colleges and universities because it may include either physical or psychological abuse, such as humiliation, nudity, or sexual abuse.

Terms

In Latvian, the word , which literally means 'in-blessings', is used, also standing for religious rites of passage, especially confirmation. In Portugal, the term , which literally means 'practice' or 'habit', is used for initiation. In Brazil, it is called  and is usually practiced at universities by older students ( and ) against newcomers in the first week of their first semester. A similar equivalent term exists in the Russian military, where a hazing phenomenon known as  exists, meaning roughly 'grandfather' or the slang term 'gramps' (referring to the senior corps of soldiers in their final year of conscription). At education establishments in India, Pakistan, Bangladesh and Sri Lanka, this practice involves existing students baiting new students and is called ragging. It often features cat-related activities, like competitive milk-drinking . Other popular tasks include measuring a long distance (i.e. hallways) with matches.

Hazings are sometimes concentrated in a single session, which may be called a hell night, prolonged to a hell week, or over a long period, resembling fagging.

Methods
One way of initiating a new member into a street gang is for multiple other members of the gang to assault the new member with a beating.

Hazing activities can involve forms of ridicule and humiliation within the group or in public, while other hazing incidents are akin to pranks. A snipe hunt is such a prank, when a newcomer or credulous person is given an impossible task. Examples of snipe hunts include being sent to find a tin of Tartan paint, or a "dough repair kit" in a bakery, while in the early 1900s rookies in the Canadian military were ordered to obtain a "brass magnet" when brass is not magnetic.

Spanking is done mainly in the form of paddling among fraternities, sororities and similar clubs. This practice is also used in the military. 

The hazee may be humiliated by being hosed or by sprinkler or buckets; covered with dirt or with (sometimes rotten) food, even urinated upon. Olive or baby oil may be used to "show off" the bare skin, for wrestling or just slipperiness, e.g., to complicate pole climbing. Cleaning may be limited to a dive into water, hosing down or even paddling the worst off. They may have to do tedious cleaning including swabbing the decks or cleaning the toilets with a toothbrush. In fraternities, pledges often must clean up a mess intentionally made by brothers which can include fecal matter, urine, and dead animals.

Servitude such as waiting on others (as at fraternity parties) or various other forms of housework may be involved, often with tests of obedience. In some cases, the hazee may be made to eat raw eggs, peppers, hot sauce, or drink too much alcohol. Some hazing even includes eating or drinking vile things such as bugs or rotting food.

The hazee may have to wear an imposed piece of clothing, outfit, item or something else worn by the victim in a way that would bring negative attention to the wearer. Examples include a uniform (e.g. toga); a leash or collar (also associated with bondage); infantile and other humiliating dress and attire.

Markings may also be made on clothing or bare skin. They are painted, written, tattooed or shaved on, sometimes collectively forming a message (one letter, syllable or word on each pledge) or may receive tarring and feathering (or rather a mock version using some glue) or branding.

Submission to senior members of the group is common. Abject "etiquette" required of pledges or subordinates may include prostration, kneeling, literal groveling, and kissing body parts.

Other physical feats may be required, such as calisthenics and other physical tests, such as mud wrestling, forming a human pyramid, or climbing a greased pole. Exposure to the elements may be required, such as swimming or diving in cold water or snow.

Orientation tests may be held, such as abandoning pledges without transport. Dares include jumping from some height, stealing from police or rival teams and obedience. Blood pinning among military aviators (and many other elite groups) to celebrate becoming new pilots is done by piercing their chests with the sharp pins of aviator wings.

On a pilot's first solo flight, they are often drenched with water, as well as having the back of their shirt cut off to celebrate the achievement. Cutting off the back of the shirt originates from the days of tandem trainers, where the instructor sat behind the student and tugged on the back of their shirt in order to get their attention. Cutting off the back of the shirt symbolizes that the instructor has no need to do that anymore.

On their first crossing the equator in military and commercial navigation, each "pollywog" is subjected to a series of tests usually including running or crawling a gauntlet of abuse and various scenes supposedly situated at King Neptune's court. A pledge auction is a variation on the slave auction, where people bid on the paraded pledges.

Hazing also occurs for apprentices in some trades. In printing, it consists of applying bronze blue to the apprentice's penis and testicles, a color made by mixing black printers ink and dark blue printers ink, which takes a long time to wash off. Similarly, mechanics get their groins smeared with old dirty grease.

Hazing by women of their suitors, often assisted by the women's friends, can also play a role in budding romantic relationships, usually taking mental and psychological rather than physical forms, and apparently for the same basic purposes as other hazing.

Psychology, sociology, purpose and effects
Hazing supposedly serves a deliberate purpose of building solidarity. Psychologist Robert Cialdini uses the framework of consistency and commitment to explain the phenomenon of hazing and the vigor and zeal to which practitioners of hazing persist in and defend these activities even when they are made illegal. Cialdini cites a 1959 study in which the researchers observed that "persons who go through a great deal of trouble or pain to attain something tend to value it more highly than persons who attain the same thing with a minimum of effort". The 1959 study shaped the development of cognitive dissonance theory by Leon Festinger.

There are several psychological effects that both the hazer and hazee endure throughout the hazing process. In an article published by Raalte, Cornelius, Linder, and Brewer, the researchers used sports teams as the subject of their study. The authors suggest that hazing can result in some positive outcomes. During the hazing process, a bond between the two parties (the hazer and the hazee) grew. Many people view hazing as an effective way to teach respect and develop discipline and loyalty within the group, and believe that hazing is a necessary component of initiation rites. Hazing can be used as a way to engender conformity within a social group, something that can be seen in many sociological studies. Moreover, initiation rituals when managed effectively can serve to build team cohesion and improve team performance, while negative and detrimental forms of hazing alienate and disparage individuals.

Dissonance can produce feelings of group attraction or social identity among initiates after the hazing experience because they want to justify the effort used. Rewards during initiations or hazing rituals matter in that initiates who feel more rewarded express stronger group identity. As well as increasing group attraction, hazing can produce conformity among new members. Hazing could also increase feelings of affiliation because of the stressful nature of the hazing experience. Also, hazing has a hard time of being extinguished by those who saw it to be potentially dangerous like administration in education or law enforcement. In an article published by Linda Wilson, she and the National Pan-Hellenic Council Leaders at North Carolina Agricultural and Technical State University gave their perspectives and opinions on hazing at their institution, and she discussed why hazing is so hard to discontinue. The reason why is because the act of hazing is deeply rooted traditionally, so it becomes hard to break those traditional actions. For example, York College in Pennsylvania tried to solve this issue with suspending students who partake in the act. However, it is hard to dismantle not only because of tradition, but also because it is meant to be done in private spaces. It is not meant to be public which makes getting rid of it even harder.

A 2014 paper by Harvey Whitehouse discusses theories that hazing can cause social cohesion though group identification and identity fusion. A 2017 study published in Scientific Reports found that groups that share painful or strong negative experiences can cause visceral bonding, and pro-group behavior. Students of Brazilian Jiu Jitsu who had experienced painful belt-whipping gauntlets had a higher willingness to donate time or risk their lives for the club.

Scope

United States

According to one of the largest US National Surveys regarding hazing including over 60,000 student athletes from 2,400 colleges and universities:

The survey found that 79% of college athletes experienced some form of hazing to join their team, yet 60% of the student-athletes respondents indicated that they would not report incidents of hazing.

A 2007 survey at American colleges found 55% of students in "clubs, teams, and organizations" experienced behavior the survey defined as hazing, including in varsity athletics and Greek-letter organizations. This survey found 47% of respondents experienced hazing before college, and in 25% of hazing cases, school staff were aware of the activity. 90% of students who experienced behavior the researchers defined as hazing did not consider themselves to have been hazed, and 95% of those who experienced what they themselves defined as hazing did not report it. The most common hazing-related activities reported in student groups included alcohol consumption, humiliation, isolation, sleep deprivation, and sex acts.

Police forces, especially those with a paramilitary tradition, or sub-units of police forces such as tactical teams, may also have hazing rituals. Rescue services, such as lifeguards or air-sea rescue teams may have hazing rituals.

Belgium
Hazing rituals are a common practice in student clubs (fraternities and sororities, called studentenclubs) and student societies (called studentenverenigingen, studentenkringen or faculteitskringen). The latter is attached to the faculty of the university, while the first ones are privately operated. Hazing rituals in student societies have generally been safer than those in student clubs, precisely because they are to some extent regulated by universities.

For example, KU Leuven drew up a hazing charter in 2013 following an animal cruelty incident in the hazing ritual of student club Reuzegom. The charter was to be signed by student societies, fraternities and sororities. Signing the charter would have been a pledge to notify the city of the place and time of the hazing ceremony, and to abstain from violence, racism, extortion, bullying, sexual assault, discrimination, and the use of vertebrate animals. Reuzegom, as well as the other fraternities and sororities of the Antwerp Guild, refused. In 2018, twenty-year-old student Sanda Dia died from multiple organ failure in the Reuzegom hazing ritual as a result of racially motivated abuse by fellow Reuzegom members. , a few sororities have signed the charter, as well as all student societies. In April 2019, the 28 remaining fraternities in Leuven signed the charter.

Netherlands
In the Netherlands, the so-called 'traditional fraternities' have an introduction time which includes hazing rituals. The pledges go for a few days to a camp during which they undergo hazing rituals but are meanwhile introduced in the traditions of the fraternity. After camp, there are usually evenings or whole days in which the pledges have to be present at the fraternity, although slowly the pressure is released and the relations become somewhat more equal. Often, pledges collect or perform chores to raise funds for charity. At the end of the hazing period, the inauguration of the new members take place.

Incidents have occurred resulting in injuries and death. Often these incidents occur when members wish to join a house, (prestigious) sub-structure or commission for which they undergo a second (and usually heavier) hazing ritual. Incidents mostly occur during hazing rituals for these sub-structures, since there is less or no control from the fraternity board. Also, these sub-structure hazing rituals involve often excessive alcohol abuse, even when alcohol has become a taboo in hazing of the fraternity itself. Other situations causing additional risks for incidents are members (often joining the hazing camp but not designated with any responsibility) separating pledges and taking them away from the main group to 'amuse themselves' with them.

In 1965 a student at Utrecht University choked to death during a hazing ritual (Roetkapaffaire). There was public outrage when the perpetrators were convicted to light conditional sentences while left-wing Provo demonstrators were given unconditional prison sentences for order disturbances. The fact that the magistrates handling the case were all alumni of the same fraternity gave rise to accusions of nepotism and class justice. Two incidents in 1997, leading to one heavy injury and one death, lead to sharpened scrutiny over hazing. Hazing incidents have nevertheless occurred since, but justice is becoming keener in persecuting perpetrators.

The Netherlands has no anti-hazing legislation. Hazing incidents can be handled by internal resolution by the fraternity itself (the lightest cases), and via the criminal justice system as assault or in case of death negligent homicide or manslaughter. Universities as a rule support student unions (financially and by granting board members of such union a discount on the required number of ECTS credits) but can in the most extreme case suspend or withdraw recognition and support for such union.

Philippines

According to R. Dayao, hazing, usually in initiation rites of fraternities, has a long history in the Philippines, and has been a source of public controversy after many cases that resulted to death of the neophyte. The first recorded death due to hazing in the Philippines was recorded in 1954, with the death of Gonzalo Mariano Albert. Hazing was regulated under the Anti-Hazing Act of 1995, after the death of Leonardo Villa in 1991, but many cases, usually causing severe injury or death, continued even after it was enacted, the latest involving Darwin Dormitorio, a 20-year old Cadet 4th Class from the Philippine Military Academy.

Republic of Ireland
Hazing incidents are rare in the Republic of Ireland, but are known at certain elite educational institutions.

At Trinity College Dublin, an all-male society, Knights of the Campanile, was implicated in a hazing incident in 2019, where initiates were required to eat large amounts of butter. Campus newspaper The University Times was criticised for using secret recording devices to record the event. Dublin University Boat Club are also known for hazing, with rituals including consumption of alcohol, stripping to ones underwear, caning with bamboo rods, push-ups, being shouted at, standing in the rain, being tied together by shoelaces and crawling a maze while being hit with pillows. Hazing is common at Trinity sports societies and teams. Zeta Psi fraternity has a presence at Trinity as well, and some hazing has been reported.

Hazing also took place at Dublin City University's Accounting & Finance Society in 2018, where first-years standing for committee positions had to complete a variety of sexualised games. The club was suspended for a year as a result.

A report on Gaelic games county players noted that 6% of players reported were aware of forced binge drinking as a form of hazing.

Ragging in South Asia

Ragging is a practice similar to hazing in educational institutions in the Indo subcontinent. The word is mainly used in India, Pakistan, Bangladesh and Sri Lanka. Ragging involves existing students baiting or bullying new students. It often takes a malignant form wherein the newcomers may be subjected to psychological or physical torture.

In 2009 the University Grants Commission of India imposed regulations upon Indian universities to help curb ragging, and launched a toll-free 'anti ragging helpline'. The effectiveness of these measures are unknown; many accused of ragging freshmen are either let out with a warning or saved from legal action by political or caste lobbyists.

Although ragging is a criminal offense in Sri Lanka under the Prohibition of Ragging and other Forms of Violence in Educational institutions Act, No. 20 of 1998 and carries a severe punishment, several variations of ragging can be observed in universities around the country. Through the years this practice has worsened to all types of violence including sexual violence, harassment and has also claimed the lives of several students. The university grants commission of Sri Lanka, have set up several pathways to report ragging incidents, including a special office, helpline and a mobile app where students can make a complaint anonymously or seek help.

Controversy

The practice of ritual abuse among social groups is not clearly understood. This is partly due to the secretive nature of the activities, especially within collegiate fraternities and sororities, and in part a result of long-term acceptance of hazing. Thus, it has been difficult for researchers to agree on the underlying social and psychological mechanisms that perpetuate hazing. In military circles hazing is sometimes assumed to test recruits under situations of stress and hostility. Although in no way a recreation of combat, hazing does put people into stressful situations that they are unable to control, which allegedly should weed out the weaker members before being put in situations where failure to perform will cost lives. A portion of the military training course known as Survival, Evasion, Resistance and Escape (SERE) simulates as closely as is feasible the physical and psychological conditions of a POW camp.

The problem with this approach, according to opponents, is that the stress and hostility comes from inside the group, and not from outside as in actual combat situation, creating suspicion and distrust towards the superiors and comrades-in-arms. Willing participants may be motivated by a desire to prove to senior soldiers their stability in future combat situations, making the unit more secure, but blatantly brutal hazing can in fact produce negative results, making the units more prone to break, desert or mutiny than those without hazing traditions, as observed in the Russian army in Chechnya, where units with the strongest traditions of dedovschina were the first to break and desert under enemy fire. At worst, hazing may lead into fragging incidents. Colleges and universities sometimes avoid publicizing hazing incidents for fear of damaging institutional reputations or incurring financial liability to victims.

In a 1999 study, a survey of 3,293 collegiate athletes, coaches, athletic directors and deans found a variety of approaches to prevent hazing, including strong disciplinary and corrective measures for known cases, implementation of athletic, behavioral, and academic standards guiding recruitment; provisions for alternative bonding and recognition events for teams to prevent hazing; and law enforcement involvement in monitoring, investigating, and prosecuting hazing incidents. Hoover's research suggested half of all college athletes are involved in alcohol-related hazing incidents, while one in five are involved in potentially illegal hazing incidents. Only another one in five was involved in what Hoover described as positive initiation events, such as taking team trips or running obstacle courses.

Hoover wrote: "Athletes most at risk for any kind of hazing for college sports were men; non-Greek members; and either swimmers, divers, soccer players, or lacrosse players. The campuses where hazing was most likely to occur were primarily in eastern or southern states with no anti-hazing laws. The campuses were rural, residential, and had Greek systems." (Hoover uses the term "Greek" to refer to U.S.-style fraternities and sororities.) Hoover found that non-fraternity members were most at risk of hazing, and that football players are most at risk of potentially dangerous or illegal hazing. In the May issue of the American Journal of Emergency Medicine, Michelle Finkel reported that hazing injuries are often not recognized for their true cause in emergency medical centers. The doctor said hazing victims sometimes hide the real cause of injuries out of shame or to protect those who caused the harm. In protecting their abusers, hazing victims can be compared with victims of domestic violence, Finkel wrote.

Finkel cites hazing incidents including "beating or kicking to the point of traumatic injury or death, burning or branding, excessive calisthenics, being forced to eat unpleasant substances, and psychological or sexual abuse of both males and females". Reported coerced sexual activity is sometimes considered "horseplay" rather than rape, she wrote. Finkel quoted from Hank Nuwer's book Wrongs of Passage, which counted 56 hazing deaths between 1970 and 1999.

In November 2005, controversy arose over a video showing Royal Marines fighting naked and intoxicated as part of a hazing ritual. The fight culminated with one soldier receiving a kick to the face, rendering him unconscious. The victim, according to the BBC, said "It's just Marine humour". The Marine who leaked the video said "The guy laid out was inches from being dead." Under further investigation, the Marines had just returned from a six-month tour of Iraq, and were in their "cooling down" period, in which they spend two weeks at a naval base before they are allowed back into society. The man who suffered the kick to the head did not press charges.

In 2008, a national hazing study was conducted by Dr Elizabeth Allan and Dr Mary Madden from the University of Maine. This investigation is the most comprehensive study of hazing to date and includes survey responses from more than 11,000 undergraduate students at 53 colleges and universities in different regions of the U.S. and interviews with more than 300 students and staff at 18 of these campuses. Through the vision and efforts of many, this study fills a major gap in the research and extends the breadth and depth of knowledge and understanding about hazing. Ten initial findings are described in the report, "Hazing in View: College Students at Risk". These include:
 More than half of college students involved in clubs, teams, and organizations experience hazing.
 Nearly half (47%) of students have experienced hazing before coming to college.
 Alcohol consumption, humiliation, isolation, sleep deprivation, and sex acts are hazing practices common across student groups.

Notable examples
With hazing, there have been countless instances where it has been taken too far and has resulted in death or near death experiences. In some instances, people who haze others are too involved in the act of doing it that they are not attentive to possible harm to the other person.

1495: Leipzig University banned the hazing of freshmen by other students: "Statute Forbidding Any One to Annoy or Unduly Injure the Freshmen. Each and every one attached to this university is forbidden to offend with insult, torment, harass, drench with water or urine, throw on or defile with dust or any filth, mock by whistling, cry at them with a terrifying voice, or dare to molest in any way whatsoever physically or severely, any, who are called freshmen, in the market, streets, courts, colleges and living houses, or any place whatsoever, and particularly in the present college, when they have entered in order to matriculate or are leaving after matriculation."
1684: Cambridge, Massachusetts, a Harvard University Student, Joseph Webb, was expelled for hazing.
1873: A New York Times headline read: "West Point. 'Hazing' at the Academy – An Evil That Should be Entirely Rooted Out"
1900: Oscar Booz began at West Point in June 1898 in good physical health. Four months later, he resigned due to health problems. He died in December 1900 of tuberculosis. During his long struggle with the illness, he blamed the illness on hazing he received at West Point in 1898, claiming he had hot sauce poured down his throat on three occasions as well as a number of other grueling hazing practices, such as brutal beatings and having hot wax poured on him in the night. His family claimed that scarring from the hot sauce made him more susceptible to the infection, causing his death. Among other things, Booz claimed that his devotion to Christianity made him a target and that he was tormented for reading his Bible.

The practice of hazing at West Point entered the national spotlight following his death. Congressional hearings investigated his death and the pattern of systemic hazing of first-year students, and serious efforts were made to reform the system and end hazing at West Point.
1903: Three young boys in Vermont, aged 11, 10, and 7, read about hazing practices in college and decided to try it themselves. They built a fire in a pasture behind the schoolhouse and led 9-year-old Ralph Canning to the spot. They heated a number of stones until they were red hot. The boys forced Canning to both sit and stand on the hot stones and held him there despite his screams. The boys then either walked or jumped on him (depending on the source). He was finally allowed to leave and he crawled home, where he died two weeks later. The public was stunned by the young age of the perpetrators.
1925: The tradition of "tubbing" came under fire following the death of Reginald Stringfellow at the University of Utah. Tubbing was a hazing ritual that involved pushing the victim's head under water until they can no longer hold their breath and gasp for air under the water. His death through class hazing – hazing of freshmen by upperclassmen – led to the practice being banned at the University of Utah and brought greater recognition to the dangers of the practice.
1959: University of Southern California pledge Richard Swanson choked to death during a hazing stunt for Kappa Sigma fraternity. Pledges were told to swallow a quarter pound piece of raw liver soaked in oil without chewing. The liver became lodged in his throat and he began choking. The fraternity brothers omitted the cause of his trouble breathing, telling police and ambulance workers instead that he was suffering from a "nervous spasm". He died two hours later. The incident inspired the 1977 film Fraternity Row as well as an episode of CSI: Crime Scene Investigation called Pledging Mr. Johnson.
1967: Delta Kappa Epsilon, Yale University. Future US president George W. Bush (who at the time was president of the fraternity) was implicated in a scandal where members of the DKE fraternity were accused of branding triangles onto the lower back of pledges. Mr. Bush is quoted as dismissing the injuries as "only a cigarette burn". The fraternity received a fine for their behavior.
1974: Pledge William Flowers, along with other pledges, was digging a deep hole in the sand (said to be a symbolic grave), when the walls collapsed and Flowers was buried, causing his death. His death spurred an anti-hazing statute in New York. Flowers would have been the first black member of Zeta Beta Tau at Monmouth had he survived.
1975: Rupa Rathnaseeli, a 22-year-old student of the Faculty of Agriculture, University of Peradeniya, Sri Lanka, became paralyzed as a result of jumping from the second floor of the hostel "Ramanathan Hall" to escape the physical ragging carried out by older students. It was reported that she was about to have a candle inserted into her vagina just before she had jumped out of the hostel building. She committed suicide in 2002.
1978: At Alfred University in western New York, student Chuck Stenzel died in a fraternity hazing incident from aspirated vomit while passed out following an evening of drinking at Klan Alpine fraternity. He had been transported to the frat house in a car trunk along with two other pledges. Following his death, his mother formed CHUCK, the Committee to Halt Useless College Killings to help stop hazing practices on college campuses.
1993–2007: In Indonesia, 35 people died as a result of hazing initiation rites in the Institute of Public Service (IPDN). The most recent was in April 2007 when Cliff Muntu died after being beaten by the seniors.
1997: Selvanayagam Varapragash, a first-year engineering student at University of Peradeniya, was murdered on the campus due to hazing. He was subjected to sadistic ragging, and in a post-mortem examination, a large quantity of toothpaste was found in his rectum.
1997: During the hazing period of a Dutch fraternity, a pledge was run over by members when he was sleeping drunk in the grass. A few weeks later, a pledge, Reinout Pfeiffer, died after drinking a large quantity of jenever as part of an initiation ritual for his student house attached to the same fraternity. These incidents prompted Dutch fraternities to regulate their hazing rituals more strictly.
2004: In Sandwich, Massachusetts, nine high school football players faced felony charges after a freshman teammate lost his spleen in a hazing ritual.
2004: On September 16, 2004, Lynn Gordon Baily Jr died at the age of 18 during a hazing ritual that he participated in. He was a part of the Chi Psi fraternity at the University of Colorado.
2005: Matthew Carrington was killed at Chico State University during a hazing activity on February 2, 2005. Matt's Law, named in Carrington's memory, was passed by the California legislature into law to eliminate hazing in California.
2005: A few months later, in May 2005, a Dutch student almost died from water intoxication after participating in a hazing drinking game in which the liquor was replaced by water.
2005: The victim of a high-profile hazing attack in Russia, Andrey Sychyov, required the amputation of his legs and genitalia after he was forced to squat for four hours whilst being beaten and tortured by a military group on New Year's Eve, 2005. President Vladimir Putin spoke out about the incident and ordered Defense Minister Sergei Ivanov "to submit proposals on legal and organizational matters to improve educational work in the army and navy".
2007: At Rider University, one fraternity pledge died and another was hospitalized with alcohol poisoning, during what a judge called "knowingly or recklessly organized, promoted, facilitated or engaged in conduct which resulted in serious bodily injury". Five people were charged, including two university administrators.
2007: On June 26 at the Tokitsukaze stable, 17-year-old sumo wrestler Takashi Saito was beaten to death by his fellow rikishi with a beer bottle and metal baseball bat at the direction of his trainer, Jun'ichi Yamamoto. Though originally reported as heart failure, Saito's father demanded an autopsy, which uncovered evidence of the beating. Both Yamamoto and the other rikishi were charged with manslaughter.
2010: In a hazing incident in the Netherlands, pledges were asked to 'baffle the members' with a stunt. They decided to do so by dressing one of them in a Sinterklaas costume, dousing the suit in lamp oil, and putting it on fire. The victim jumped in the water in his burning costume, and suffered second-degree burns, needing medical treatment. The student who set the victim's costume on fire was sentenced to 50 hours of unpaid work.
2011: Two Andover High School basketball players were expelled and five were suspended for pressuring underclassmen to play "wet biscuit", where the loser was forced to eat a semen-soaked cookie.
2011: Thirteen students from Florida Agricultural and Mechanical University attacked drum major Robert Champion on a bus after a marching band performance, beating him to death. Since the 2011 death, a series of reports of abuse and hazing within the band have been documented. In May 2012, two faculty members resigned in connection with a hazing investigation and 13 people were charged with felony or misdemeanor hazing crimes. Eleven of those individuals faced one count of third-degree felony hazing resulting in death, which is punishable by up to six years in prison. The FAMU incident prompted Florida Governor Rick Scott to order all state universities to examine their hazing and harassment policies in December. Scott also asked all university presidents to remind their students, faculty and staff "how detrimental hazing can be".
2013: Chun Hsien Deng, a freshman at Baruch College, died during a hazing incident after he was blindfolded and made to wear a backpack weighted with sand while trying to make his way across a frozen yard as members of a fraternity, Pi Delta Psi, tried to tackle him. During at least one tackle, he was lifted up and dropped on the ground in a move known as spearing. He complained his head hurt but continued participating and was eventually knocked out. After Deng was knocked unconscious, the authorities said the fraternity members delayed in seeking medical help.
2013: Tyler Lawrence, a student at Wilmington College (Ohio), lost a testicle as a result of hazing after being forced to lie down nude on a basement floor wet with three inches of water, stuffed with hamburgers, then ball-gagged, and finally being hit in his scrotum with towels and shirts that were tied with balled ends or other objects. Despite being painfully injured, he was then forced to sit up and swallow vinegar soaked bananas.
2014: Seven members of the Sayreville War Memorial High School football team in Sayreville, New Jersey, were arrested and charged with sexual assaults on younger players. "In the darkness, a freshman football player would be pinned to the locker-room floor, his arms and feet held down by multiple upperclassmen. Then, the victim would be lifted to his feet" and sexually abused. Six of the team members were sentenced for lesser crimes, and the seventh case was still pending in 2016.
2016: In August 2016, a student in a Dutch fraternity suffered serious head injuries after a member forced him to lie on the floor, placed his foot on his head and exercised pressure on the skull. The perpetrator was convicted to a prison sentence of 31 days (of which 30 days conditional), 240 hours of unpaid labor, and €5,066.80 damage compensation to the victim. The perpetrator appealed against this verdict, after which it was reduced in appeal to a fine of €1,000.
2016: In December 2016, Newcastle University student Ed Farmer, 20, died from a cardiac arrest and immense brain damage after an initiation ceremony into the Agricultural Society. Events included head shaving, being sprayed with paint used to mark stock, drinking vodka from a pig's head, and bobbing for apples in a mixture of urine and alcohol. Farmer was known to have drunk 27 vodka shots in three hours. Initiation ceremonies have been strictly banned by the university.
2017: Tim Piazza died as result of a hazing incident while pledging a fraternity at Pennsylvania State University, where he was made to have 18 drinks in fewer than 1 hours, then later fell headfirst onto a set of stairs. Despite observing grievous injuries to Piazza, fraternity brothers waited nearly 12 hours before calling for medical assistance. The Piazza case resulted in one of the largest hazing prosecutions in United States history. Following a grand jury investigation, 18 members of the fraternity were charged in connection with Piazza's death: 8 were charged with involuntary manslaughter and the rest with other offenses, including hazing. In addition to the fraternity "brothers", the fraternity itself (Beta Theta Pi) was also charged.
2017: Maxwell Gruver died, after having too much alcohol as a result of being forced to consume drinks every time he gave wrong answers regarding his fraternity (Louisiana State University, at 18 years old).
2017: Andrew Coffey, age 20, died after passing out following drinking an entire bottle of Wild Turkey bourbon (Florida State University).
2017: Matthew Ellis, a Texas State student, died at 20 years old after an undisclosed hazing ritual.
2018: Three Flemish Belgian students, from the KU Leuven were hospitalized after consuming a large amount of fish sauce as part of a hazing ritual. One slipped into a coma and died, likely due to a combination of the high concentration of salt in the sauce and hypothermia.

See also
 Dedovshchina
 Groupthink
 Schadenfreude
 Stanford prison experiment
 Stockholm Syndrome

References

Further reading

External links

 
 IMDb references by the word  and keyword 
 World Corporal Punishment Research Corporal punishment as initiation

 
Crimes
Abuse
Education issues
Group processes
Rites of passage